Snapshot: Live at the Iron Horse is singer-songwriter Livingston Taylor's ninth album, released in 1999.

Track listing
"I Believe" – 3:15
"O Loretta" – 2:40
"I'm Not As Herbal as I Ought to Be" – 2:50
"The Dollar Bill Song" – 3:40
"Bicycle" – 3:16
"Olympic Guitar" – 4:23
"You Can Take Me Home" – 3:24
"Doggie Jail" – 1:14
"Railroad Bill" – 6:18
"Walking My Baby Back Home" – 3:02
"The Way You Look Tonight" – 1:44
"Our Turn to Dance" – 3:22
"No Easy Way to Break Somebody's Heart" – 5:24
"Piano Noodle" – 1:03
"Loving Arms" – 5:11
"Through the Fire" – 3:56
"Songs That Should Never Be Played on the Banjo" – 6:59
"My Father's Eyes" – 2:48
"Glad I Know You Well" – 3:25

Livingston Taylor albums
1999 live albums